Yefeh Nof is a neighborhood in west Jerusalem, founded in 1929. Together with Ramat Beit HaKerem and Givat Beit HaKerem, it is part of the larger Beit HaKerem neighborhood. Its name is one of the seventy poetic names the Hebrew Bible uses for Jerusalem (Psalms 48:3), and literally means "beautiful view".

Character of the neighborhood

The neighborhood is characterized by spaced building of three stories height, and a few cottages.  At an elevation of 775 meters above sea level, the neighborhood offers views toward the Jerusalem Forest which resides in a nearby valley.

Institutions
Yad Sarah's main offices are on Herzl Boulevard
The Yefeh Nof School

Neighbourhoods of Jerusalem